Melodie Sisk is an Atlanta-based independent film producer and actress  known for White Reindeer, The Ladies of the House, Summer of Blood, Little Sister, Social Animals and The Death of Dick Long for A24 Films.

Sisk was born in Bat Cave, North Carolina but raised mostly in Atlanta.

Filmography

References

External links

Living people
American women film producers
Year of birth missing (living people)